Shauna MacDonald or Macdonald may refer to:
Shauna MacDonald (Canadian actress) (born 1970)
Shauna Macdonald (Scottish actress) (born 1981)

See also
Shaun MacDonald (disambiguation)